Metropolitan Irineos (born Michail Galanakis; November 10, 1911 – April 30, 2013) was bishop of Constantinople Orthodox Church, Metropolitan of Germany.

Notes

1911 births
2013 deaths
Greek centenarians
Men centenarians
Bishops of the Ecumenical Patriarchate of Constantinople
Bishops in Germany
Eastern Orthodox bishops in Europe
People from Chania (regional unit)